Syops is an extinct genus of dicynodont therapsid. The type species S. vanhoepeni was first named in 1938 as Dicynodon vanhoepeni. Fossils of the genus have been found in the Cistecephalus Assemblage Zone in the Usili Formation of the Ruhuhu Basin, Tanzania and Madumabisa Mudstone, Zambia. Its phylogenetic placement is somewhat uncertain, with multiple different studies finding it as either a basal geikiid, rhachiocephalid a dicynodontoid more derived than the most basal genera but less derived than Lystrosauridae, or a lystrosaurid.

References 

Dicynodonts
Lopingian synapsids of Africa
Fossils of Tanzania
Fossils of Zambia
Fossil taxa described in 2011
Anomodont genera